Nisaba Adi "Nisa" Godrej (born 1978) is the chairperson of Godrej Consumer Products (GCPL).

She also oversees the corporate strategy and human capital functions for Godrej Industries and its associated companies. Nisa is head of the Godrej Group's 'Good & Green' (CSR) initiative and is the point person for the operations of the Godrej Family Council.

She is a board member of GCPL, Godrej Agrovet and Teach For India.

Early life
Nisa is the youngest daughter of Adi Godrej and Parmeshwar Godrej. Her siblings are Tanya Dubash and Pirojsha Adi Godrej.

She completed her schooling from The Cathedral & John Connon School. She earned a bachelor's degree from The Wharton School, University of Pennsylvania and an MBA from Harvard Business School.

Career
Nisa's previous assignments within the Godrej Group include the turnaround of Godrej Agrovet. She has overseen various projects in innovation, strategy and HR for Godrej Industries and its associate companies. Nisa Godrej was appointed to the board of Godrej Agrovet in the year 2008. Her first step involved the appointment of her classmate at Harvard, Mark Kahn, as the executive vice president at Godrej Agrovet, paving the way to hiring foreign nationals for leadership positions at Godrej. 

Nisaba Godrej was announced as executive chairperson of Godrej Consumer Products Limited (GCPL) in May 2017. During this time, she became the youngest chairperson of a company whose consolidated revenue was Rs 9,600 crore.

Personal life 
Nisa lives in Mumbai with her children, Zoran and Aidan.  

Her father, Adi Godrej, is the Chairman of the Godrej Group.

Other positions 
Nisa is a board member of Teach for India.

References

External links
 Godrej.com
 Forbes Article

Indian women business executives
Indian business executives
Living people
Parsi people from Mumbai
Harvard Business School alumni
Articles created or expanded during Women's History Month (India) - 2014
Godrej Group
Businesspeople from Mumbai
Businesswomen from Maharashtra
1978 births
Godrej family